Tom Donahoe is a football executive who most recently served as the senior director of player personnel for the Philadelphia Eagles. Previously, he was general manager of the Buffalo Bills and the Pittsburgh Steelers of the National Football League (NFL).

Biography
Donahoe was born and raised in the Pittsburgh suburb of Mt. Lebanon.  He is a grandson of longtime Pittsburgh mayor and Pennsylvania Governor David L. Lawrence.  He was "director of football operations" (GM) for the Pittsburgh Steelers from 1991 to 1999. In what was largely seen as a power struggle between himself and head coach Bill Cowher, Donahoe left the team following the 1999 season.

In 2000, Donahoe took on a job at ESPN.com for the following year.

Before the 2001 season, Donahoe was selected to replace John Butler as general manager of the Buffalo Bills, as well as take over the position of team president from a retiring Ralph Wilson. Wilson, while still maintaining ownership of the team, wanted to step aside from the day-to-day operations of the franchise, and chose Donahoe to take his place. After the 2005 season, Donahoe was fired. The team had been 31–48 during his tenure with the team from 2001 to 2005, and he drafted only three players who would go on to make the Pro Bowl with the team. Wilson re-assumed the role of president, and the general manager position was filled by former Bills head coach Marv Levy.

Since 2012 he has been a senior advisor to the Philadelphia Eagles. On December 30, 2015, Donahoe was named Senior Director of Player Personnel during a press conference by Eagles owner Jeffrey Lurie addressing the sudden firing of head coach/GM Chip Kelly following a losing season and several contentious roster moves. With the Eagles, Donahoe won Super Bowl LII.

On May 7, 2022, the Eagles parted ways with Donahoe.

References

Living people
Year of birth missing (living people)
Buffalo Bills executives
Pittsburgh Steelers executives
National Football League general managers
National Football League team presidents